SurrealEstate is a Canadian paranormal drama television series that premiered on July 16, 2021, on CTV Sci-Fi Channel.

Premise
Real estate agent Luke Roman and an elite team of specialists handle the cases that no one else can: haunted and possessed houses that literally scare would-be buyers away.

Cast

Main
 Tim Rozon as Luke Roman, the head of a real estate agency which deals with haunted houses.
 Sarah Levy as agent Susan Ireland, the newcomer of the agency. She's a  people person . 
 Adam Korson as paranormal researcher and former Catholic priest Phil Orley
 Maurice Dean Wint as technology specialist August Ripley, he does the designs and the construction. He also studies how the architecture connects with supernatural energy. 
 Savannah Basley as Zooey L'Enfant
 Tennille Read as Megan Donovan

Recurring
 Jennifer Dale as  Victoria Roman

Guest
Melanie Scrofano, reuniting with her Wynonna Earp co-star Rozon, appeared in one episode and directed two episodes

Episodes

Notes

Production
The series produced by Blue Ice Pictures was first announced in 2020, originally under the working title The Surrealtor, and was shot in St. John's, Newfoundland and Labrador.

In October 2021, series creator George Olsen announced Syfy would not be picking up the series for a second season, adding that he would attempt to find a new home for the series. In May 2022, it was announced Syfy had reversed its cancellation. The second season is scheduled to air in 2023.

Broadcast
In the United States, the first season of SurrealEstate was broadcast on Syfy.

In March 2022, it was announced Leonine Studios had sold the rights to the series to more than 160 territories.

References

External links
Official Syfy Site

2021 Canadian television series debuts
2020s Canadian science fiction television series
2020s Canadian drama television series
Canadian supernatural television series
CTV Sci-Fi Channel original programming
Syfy original programming
Television shows filmed in St. John's, Newfoundland and Labrador
English-language television shows
Paranormal television
Television series by Bell Media